Sanin Pintul (born 18 November 1970) is a Bosnia and Herzegovina former footballer who is last known to have played as a defender for Young Boys.

Club career
In 1994, Pintul signed for German third division side Stahl Brandenburg.

Before the 1997 season, he signed for Athletico-PR in Brazil, becoming the first Eastern European to play there.

In 1997, he signed for Turkish club Karabükspor.

In 1998, Pintul signed for Young Boys in Switzerland.

International career
He made his debut for Bosnia and Herzegovina in an October 1996 World Cup qualification match against Croatia and has earned a total of 7 caps, scoring 2 goals. His final international was a February 1997 Dunhill Cup match against Malaysia.

References

External links
 

1970 births
Living people
Footballers from Sarajevo
Association football defenders
Yugoslav footballers
Bosnia and Herzegovina footballers
Bosnia and Herzegovina international footballers
FK Velež Mostar players
FC Stahl Brandenburg players
VfB Oldenburg players
FK Željezničar Sarajevo players
Club Athletico Paranaense players
Kardemir Karabükspor footballers
BSC Young Boys players
Yugoslav First League players
Oberliga (football) players
Regionalliga players
Premier League of Bosnia and Herzegovina players
Campeonato Brasileiro Série A players
Süper Lig players
Swiss Super League players
Swiss Challenge League players
Bosnia and Herzegovina expatriate footballers
Expatriate footballers in Germany
Bosnia and Herzegovina expatriate sportspeople in Germany
Expatriate footballers in Brazil
Bosnia and Herzegovina expatriates in Brazil
Expatriate footballers in Turkey
Bosnia and Herzegovina expatriate sportspeople in Turkey
Expatriate footballers in Switzerland
Bosnia and Herzegovina expatriate sportspeople in Switzerland